Aikatsu! is an anime television series created and produced by Sunrise, Telecom Animation Film, (and later by Sunrise's spin-off studio, BN Pictures) based on a card arcade game by Bandai. The series revolves around Ichigo Hoshimiya, an aspiring idol who enrolls into Starlight Academy and partakes in auditions using special Aikatsu cards. The series began airing on TV Tokyo from October 8, 2012.

For episodes 76-101, the opening theme is "SHINING LINE*" by Waka, Fūri, and Yuna, whilst the ending theme is "Precious" by Risuko, Waka, Fūri, and Mona. For episodes 102-126, the opening and ending themes respectively are "Du-Du-Wa DO IT!!" by Ruka, Mona, Miki, and Waka and "Good morning my dream" by Ruka, Mona, and Miki. From episode 153 onwards, the opening and ending themes respectively are "START DASH SENSATION" and "lucky train!", both by Ruka, Mona, and Miki.

The series began release on DVD by Bandai Visual subsidiary Happinet from March 2, 2013, with initial releases of each volume containing bonus cards that can be used with Data Carddass machines. Beginning with the second season on March 4, 2014, the series is also being released on Blu-ray Disc.

Episodes

Season 1

Season 2

Season 3

Season 4

Movies

Releases

Season 1

Season 2

Coverage Area
Aikatsu! is not only seen on stations the TX Network across major cities in the Taiheiyō Belt and Hokkaido, but also on other TV networks across the country.

Tōhoku
Aomori Broadcasting Corporation (RAB)
Akita Broadcasting System (ABS)
Television Iwate (TVI)
Yamagata Broadcasting Company (YBC)
Higashinippon Broadcasting (KHB)
Fukushima Television Broadcasting (FTV)
Kantō, Shin'etsu, Shizuoka
Niigata Sogo Television (NST)
Nagano Broadcasting Systems (NBS)
UHF Television Yamanashi (UTY)
Toyama Television (BBT)
Shizuoka Asahi Television (SATV)
Kinki, Chūkyō, Hokuriku
Sun Television (SUN)
Kyoto Broadcasting System (KBS)
Gifu Broadcasting System (GBS)
Mie Television (MTV)
Nara Television (TVN)
Biwako Broadcasting (BBC)
Television Wakayama (WTV)
Fukui Television Broadcasting (FTB)
Hokuriku Broadcasting Company (MRO)
Chūgoku, Shikoku
Nihonkai Telecasting (NKT)
Hiroshima Home Television (HOME)
Nankai Broadcasting (RNB)
Kochi Broadcasting (RKC)
Kyūshū, Okinawa
Nagasaki Broadcasting (NBC)
Kumamoto Asahi Broadcasting (KAB)
Television Oita System (TOS)
Miyazaki Broadcasting (MRT)
Kagoshima Television (KTS)
Okinawa Television (OTV)

References

Aikatsu!
Aikatsu!